

Roche Miette is a   mountain located at the northwestern tip of the Miette Range in Jasper National Park, in the Canadian Rockies of Alberta, Canada. The peak is a prominent landmark in the Athabasca Valley that is situated approximately thirty kilometres north-northeast of the municipality of Jasper, and four kilometres northeast of the Jasper House National Historic Site. It is visible from Highway 16 and the Canadian. Its nearest higher peak is Capitol Mountain,  to the southeast. Roche Miette translates from French as Crumb Rock.

History

According to James Hector and folklore, Bonhomme Miette, a French Canadian voyageur and gifted fiddler, made the first ascent by climbing it from its south side. (The Fiddle River and Fiddle Range are located immediately northeast of Roche Miette and Miette Range.)

In 1907 Arthur P. Coleman wrote of it: "The most impressive bit of architecture along the Athabasca, pushing its bold front out into the valley like a commanding fort with unscalable walls three thousand feet high, and a flat top somewhat parapeted and loop-holed."

The mountain's name was officially adopted in 1956 by the Geographical Names Board of Canada.

Geology

Roche Miette is composed of sedimentary rock laid down during the Precambrian to Jurassic periods and later pushed east and over the top of younger rock during the Laramide orogeny. The summit block is made of Palliser Formation limestone.

Climate

Based on the Köppen climate classification, Roche Miette is located in a subarctic climate with cold, snowy winters, and mild summers. Temperatures can drop below -20 °C with wind chill factors below -30 °C. In terms of favorable weather, June through September are the best months to climb. Precipitation runoff from Roche Miette drains into the Athabasca River.

See also

 Geography of Alberta
 Scrambles in the Canadian Rockies

References

External links
 Weather forecast: Roche Miette
 Parks Canada web site: Jasper National Park

Two-thousanders of Alberta
Canadian Rockies
Mountains of Jasper National Park
Alberta's Rockies